Hendrick Bloemaert (1601 or 1602 – 30 December 1672) was a Dutch Golden Age painter.

Biography
Hendrick was the oldest son of Abraham Bloemaert. His brothers Cornelis and Adriaen were also painters. In 1626 he was registered in Rome, but by 1631 he was back in Utrecht, where he registered in the Utrecht Guild of St. Luke and married Margaretha van der Eem, the daughter of a lawyer.

Works

According to Houbraken, he never became as good as his father, but it is unclear whether Houbraken saw his work or copied this comment from Joachim von Sandrart. He is considered an important member of the Utrecht school of Caravaggisti, and was known for his portraits and historical allegories. He was also known for his poetry.

References

External links
 

1600s births
1672 deaths
Dutch Golden Age painters
Dutch male painters
Artists from Utrecht
Painters from Utrecht
Bloemaert family
Caravaggisti